Daniel Ivan Goldman (born January 24, 1972) is an experimental physicist regarded for his research on the biomechanics of animal locomotion within complex materials. Goldman is currently a professor at the Georgia Institute of Technology School of Physics, where he holds a Dunn Family Professorship.

Life
Goldman was born on January 24, 1972, in Richmond, Virginia, to Stanley A. Goldman and Frances T. Goldman. In September 1990 he moved to Boston, Massachusetts, to attend the Massachusetts Institute of Technology, where he received an S.B. in physics in 1994. In September 1994 he moved to Austin, Texas, and enrolled in graduate school in physics at University of Texas at Austin, where he earned a Ph.D. in 2002.  He did postdoctoral work in locomotion biomechanics at the University of California at Berkeley until 2006 when he joined the faculty of Georgia Institute of Technology in 2007.

Scientific work
Goldman's research integrates biological physics and nonlinear dynamics at the interface of biomechanics, robotics, and granular physics. His research addresses problems in non-equilibrium systems that involve interaction of physical and biological matter with complex materials (like granular media) that can flow when stressed. For example, how do organisms like lizards, crabs, and cockroaches generate appropriate musculoskeletal dynamics to scurry rapidly over substrates like sand, bark, leaves, and grass. The study of novel biological and physical interactions with complex media can also lead to the discovery of principles that govern the physics of the media. Goldman's research integrate laboratory and field studies of organism biomechanics with systematic laboratory studies of physics of the substrates, create models of the substrates, and create mathematical and physical (robot) models of the organisms.

Awards
 Dunn Family Professorship
 Georgia Power Professor of Excellence
 Fellow of the American Physical Society (2014)
 NSF Presidential Early Career Award for Scientists and Engineers
 DARPA Young Faculty Award
 Sigma Xi Young Faculty award

Publications

Selected academic works

See also
 Granular material
 Scincus scincus

References

External links 
 Professor Daniel Goldman's Complex Rheology And Biomechanics Lab

1972 births
Living people
21st-century American physicists
MIT Department of Physics alumni
University of Texas at Austin College of Natural Sciences alumni
Georgia Tech faculty
Recipients of the Presidential Early Career Award for Scientists and Engineers